Jacques Janse van Rensburg (born 6 September 1987) is a South African racing cyclist, who currently rides for amateur mountain biking team First Move. He is no relation to fellow South African professional cyclist Reinardt Janse van Rensburg.

During his road racing career, Janse van Rensburg rode in the 2014 Vuelta a España. He was named in the start list for the 2015 Tour de France. In the same year he won the South African National Road Race Championships. He was named in the start list for the 2017 Giro d'Italia.

Major results

2004
 2nd Road race, National Junior Road Championships
2005
 1st  Road race, National Junior Road Championships
2008
 3rd Overall Giro del Capo
 10th Overall Grand Prix du Portugal
2009
 6th Overall Tour de Langkawi
2010
 6th Overall Tour de Filipinas
2011
 6th Overall Tour of South Africa
2012
 1st  Overall Tour of Eritrea
1st Stage 2
2014
 1st  Overall Mzansi Tour
1st Stage 1
 6th Overall Tour de Langkawi
2015
 1st  Road race, National Road Championships
 3rd  Road race, African Road Championships
 5th Overall Tour of Oman
 9th Overall Tour de Langkawi
2016
 1st  Combativity classification Tour of Oman
2017
 5th Road race, National Road Championships
2018
 2nd Road race, National Road Championships
2022
 6th Road race, National Road Championships

Grand Tour general classification results timeline

References

External links

1987 births
Living people
South African male cyclists
People from Springs, Gauteng
White South African people
Sportspeople from Gauteng